Lake Solai is a saltwater lake in the Rift Valley Province of Kenya. Geological conditions at the lake during the Little Ice Age have been the object of a scientific study.

In 2014 there was a major contamination event at the lake.

References 

Lakes of Kenya